Maksymilian Grecki (Poznań, 1841 – Poznań, 1870) was a Polish pianist and composer. He was the son of a church organist, who studied in Leipzig with Franz Brendel and Ignaz Moscheles. He died of tuberculosis at the age of 30. His small number of works consist mainly of songs.

References

External links
 Scores by Maksymilian Grecki in digital library  Polona

1841 births
1870 deaths
19th-century deaths from tuberculosis
19th-century composers
Tuberculosis deaths in Poland